Andreas Blau is a German flutist. He is a former principal flutist of the Berlin Philharmonic.

Early life
Blau's father was a violinist with the Berlin Philharmonic, joining the orchestra in 1948, a year before Andreas was born. Blau auditioned for principal flute and joined the orchestra at the age of 20 after brief studies at the Hochschule für Musik in Berlin, the Salzburg Mozarteum, and in the United States, also receiving several international awards.

Career

Performing
As a soloist, he performed under Herbert von Karajan, David Oistrach, Yehudi Menuhin, Claudio Abbado, and Sir Simon Rattle.

He is the founder and director of The 14 Berlin Flutes, an ensemble formed in 1996 composed entirely of flute players from various Berlin orchestras. The ensemble plays various instruments in the flute family, ranging from the piccolo to the contrabass flute.

Blau was the principal flute of the Berlin Philharmonic since 1969 before retiring in June 2015 after 46 years. He was succeeded by Mathieu Dufour from the Chicago Symphony.

Teaching
Since 1973, he has been a flute professor and many of his students are active in major orchestras around the world. He also teaches master classes in many countries and has been invited to numerous international competitions as a jury member. In 2005, Blau was appointed Honorary Professor at the Shanghai Conservatory of Music.

Personal life
Blau's father-in-law was Fritz Wesenigk (24 April 19237 March 2009), a trumpet player who was also in the Berlin Philharmonic. Blau's daughter Alexandra is married to Albrecht Mayer, the orchestra's principal oboist.

References

Living people
1949 births
Players of the Berlin Philharmonic
Musicians from Berlin
German classical flautists